Pine Ridge, Nebraska may refer to:
Whiteclay, Nebraska, known to the U.S. Census Bureau as "Pine Ridge, Nebraska"
Pine Ridge (region)
Pine Ridge, Dawes County, Nebraska